All the Greatest Hits is a music DVD by the pop/rock band McFly. The DVD was filmed during their Greatest Hits Tour in 2007, with the majority of the footage recorded at the Wolverhampton Civic Hall. The DVD was released on 3 December 2007. The DVD also includes all 18 of McFly's Music Videos to date of release except for "Baby's Coming Back", which was dropped for unknown reasons.

Concert Track listing
 "That Girl"
 "Friday Night"
 "Obviously"
 "Star Girl"
 "Broccoli"
 "I Wanna Hold You"
 "I'll Be OK"
 "Transylvania"
 "The Heart Never Lies"
 "Umbrella"
 "All About You"
 "Please Please"
 "Room on the 3rd Floor"
 "Don't Stop Me Now"
 "5 Colours in Her Hair"

Music videos
 5 Colours in Her Hair
 Obviously
 That Girl
 Room on the Third Floor
 All About You
 You've Got a Friend
 I'll Be OK
 Pinball Wizard
 I Wanna Hold You
 Ultraviolet
 The Ballad of Paul K
 Please, Please
 Don't Stop Me Now
 Star Girl
 Friday Night
 Sorry's Not Good Enough
 Transylvania
 The Heart Never Lies

Notes
 "Broccoli" was performed at the three opening shows and the 18 October and 6 December shows at the London Astoria and Wembley Arena, respectively. At all other shows, it was replaced with "Ultraviolet" and "Sorry's Not Good Enough".

Chart performance

Tour dates
These tour dates are taken from setlist.fm.

References

All the Greatest Hits (DVD)
2007 video albums
Music video compilation albums
2007 compilation albums